Nabumali High School (NHS) is a mixed, boarding, secondary school in the Eastern Region of Uganda.

Location
This location is at the foothills of Wanale, one of the mountain ranges that make up Mount Elgon.

History
The school was founded by the Church Missionary Society in 1900. It moved to its present location in 1912. In August 2004, a student strike occurred at the school in protest of the school bursar's alleged mishandling of funds. The performance of the school was exemplary in the 1960s through the 1990s. During the 2000s, standards have declined. However, there is currently an effort involving alumni to revive the school's former glory.

Etymology 
According to a former acting headmaster in 2006, Israel Wabusela Walukhuli, the name "Nabumali" is a European pronunciation of a site that originally belonged to lady known as "Nabumati".

Previous headteachers and administration
 Reverend W. A Crabtree
Reverend H. K Banks
Nasanaeri Gavamukulya
Canon Philip Bottomley 
Ronald Wareham

Notable alumni

Owinyi Dolo-chief justice-Uganda
Catherine Bamugemerire 
 Aggrey Awori – former Ugandan Minister of Information Technology and a former member of Uganda's Parliament
Aggrey Jaden hi– Founding Father of the Republic of South Sudan and first South Sudanese to attain a degree South Sudan
Ambassador Edith Grace Sempala
 John Garang – former vice president of Sudan and former leader of Southern Sudan
 James Wapakhabulo – former foreign minister of Uganda and speaker of parliament
 James Munange Ogoola – chairperson of the Judicial Service Commission – Uganda and former principal judge
Robert Kabushenga - chief executive officer of the Vision Group- 
 Beatrice Wabudeya

References

Boarding schools in Uganda
Educational institutions established in 1900
Mixed schools in Uganda
Mbale District
1900 establishments in Uganda